SEAT produces the following vehicles, past and present, including under the performance-oriented Cupra brand.

Current models

SEAT brand

Cupra brand

SEAT MÓ models 

 eKickscooter 25 (2020–present)   
 eKickscooter 65 (2020–present)   
 eScooter 125 (2020–present)

Former models 

 1400 A / 1400 B / 1400 C (1953–1963)
 600 N / 600 D / 600 E / 600 L (1957–1973)
 1500 / 1500 Familiar (1963–1972)
 800 (1963–1968)
 850 (2/4-doors) (1966–1974)
 850 Coupé (1967–1972)
 850 Spyder (1970–1972)
 850 Sport Coupé (1967)
 124 / 124 Familiar (1968–1980)
 1430 (1969–1975)
 124 Sport (1970–1975)
 127 (1972–1982)
 132 (1973–1982)
 133 (1974–1981)
 131 / 131 Familiar (1975–1983)
 1200 Sport (1975–1981)
 128 (1976–1980)
 Ritmo (1979–1983)
 Panda (1980–1986)
 Ronda (1982–1986)
 Trans (1982–1986)
 Fura (3/5-doors) (1982–1986)
 Ibiza Mk1 (3/5-doors) (1984–1993)
 Málaga (1985–1992)
 Terra / Terra box (1987–1996)
 Marbella / Marbella box (1986–1998)
 Toledo Mk1 (1991–1998)
 Ibiza Mk2 (3/5-doors) (1993–2002)
 Córdoba / Córdoba SX / Córdoba Vario Mk1 (1993–2002)
 Inca Kombi / Inca Van (1995–2003)
 Alhambra Mk1 (1996–2010)
 Arosa (1997–2004)
 Toledo Mk2 (1998–2004)
 León Mk1 (1999–2005)
 Ibiza Mk3 (3/5-doors) (2002–2008)
 Córdoba Mk2 (2002–2009)
 Toledo Mk3 (2004–2009)
 Altea (2004–2015)
 León Mk2 (2005–2012)
 Exeo (2008–2013)
 Toledo Mk4 (2012–2018)
 Alhambra Mk3 (2010–2020)
 Mii (2011–2021)

Concept models 

 1400 A Descapotable
 600 prototype (Geneva, 1955)
 750 Sport (Barcelona, 1957)
 600 Multiple (Barcelona, 1959)
 Ibiza Mk1 cabrio
 Proto TLD (Turin, 1988)
 Proto T (Frankfurt, 1989)
 Proto C (Paris, 1990)
 Proto TL (Geneva, 1990)
 Marbella Playa (Frankfurt, 1991)
 Toledo Mk1 exclusive (Geneva,1992)
 Toledo Mk1 electric (1992)
 Concepto T coupé (Paris, 1992)
 Concepto T cabrio (Barcelona, 1993)
 Ibiza Mk2 electric (1993)
 Córdoba Mk2 cabrio
 Rosé (1994)
 Inca electric (Hanover, 1995)
 Alhambra prototype (Geneva, 1995)
 Bolero (Geneva, 1998)
 Toledo Cupra concept (1999)
 Fórmula (Geneva, 1999)
 Salsa (Geneva, 2000)
 Salsa Emoción (Paris, 2000)
 León Cupra R concept (Barcelona, 2001)
 Tango roadster/Tango spyder/Tango coupé/Tango Racer (Frankfurt, 2001)
 Arosa City cruiser (Frankfurt, 2001)
 Arosa Racer (Frankfurt, 2001)
 Altea Prototipo (Frankfurt, 2003)
 Cupra GT (Barcelona, 2003)
 Toledo Prototipo (Madrid, 2004)
 León Prototipo (Geneva, 2005)
 Altea FR Prototipo (Frankfurt, 2005)
 Altea 2 litre 170 hp TDI prototype (2005)
 Ibiza Vaillante concept (Geneva, 2006)
 León Pies Descalzos (Berlin, 2007)
 Altea Freetrack Prototipo (Geneva, 2007)
 Tribu concept (Frankfurt, 2007)
 Bocanegra (Geneva, 2008)
 León Ecomotive concept (Geneva, 2009)
 León Twin drive (Martorell, 2009)
 IBZ concept (Frankfurt, 2009)
 IBE concept I (Geneva, 2010)
 IBE concept II (Paris, 2010)
 IBX concept (Geneva, 2011)
 IBL concept (Frankfurt, 2011)
 Altea Electric XL Ecomotive (2011)
 Toledo concept (Geneva, 2012)
 SEAT Mii FR Line (Wörthersee, 2012) and (París, 2012)
 SEAT Ibiza FR Dashboard (Wörthersee, 2012)
 SEAT e-Mii (Barcelona, 2013)
 SEAT León verde plug-in (Martorell, 2013)
 SEAT Ibiza Cupster (Wörthersee, 2014)
 20V20 (Geneva, 2015)
 el-Born (Geneva, 2019)
 Minimo (Barcelona, 2019)

External links 

 Official website

SEAT
SEAT